Warren County Courthouse is a historic county courthouse located at Warren, Warren County, Pennsylvania.  It was built in 1876–1877, and is a 2 1/2-story, brick and sandstone building in the Second Empire style. It has a slate covered mansard roof. It measures 72 feet by 122 feet, and has a large 4-sided dome topped by a square clock tower and statue of justice.

It was designed by architect Milton Earl Beebe.

It was added to the National Register of Historic Places in 1976.

See also
 List of state and county courthouses in Pennsylvania

References

County courthouses in Pennsylvania
Courthouses on the National Register of Historic Places in Pennsylvania
Renaissance Revival architecture in Pennsylvania
Government buildings completed in 1877
Buildings and structures in Warren, Pennsylvania
National Register of Historic Places in Warren County, Pennsylvania
1877 establishments in Pennsylvania